The Sigma 18-300mm F3.5-6.3 DC Macro OS HSM Contemporary is an APS-C superzoom lens made by Sigma Corporation.

External links
Product page

Superzoom lenses
018-300mm f 3.5-6.3 DC Macro OS HSM
Camera lenses introduced in 2014